Hott 93 (93.5 FM) is a radio station broadcasting from Trinidad and Tobago.

References

 http://hott93.com

See also
951 Remix
Star 947

Radio stations in Trinidad and Tobago